WATO may refer to:

 WATO (AM), a defunct radio station in Tennessee, United States
 The World at One, a BBC news program
 We Are the Ocean, an English alternative rock band
 Komodo Airport (ICAO code WATO), Flores, Indonesia 
 HMAS Wato, Australian tug boat in  World War II
 WATO (software), a web administration application, part of the Check_MK software
 wato or watu was a village of the Kwikwasut'inuxw group of Kwakwaka'wakw at the head of Thompson Sound (British Columbia), Canada